Conservatory–Central Park Drive is a station on the Chicago Transit Authority's 'L' system, serving the Green Line. The station opened on June 30, 2001. It is located in the East Garfield Park neighborhood and named for the Garfield Park Conservatory just outside the station.

Conservatory–Central Park Drive station replaced the former Homan station on the Lake Street Elevated two blocks east. During construction of the station, the Homan historic station house was moved to its current location.

Notes and references

Notes

References

External links 
 
 Conservatory – Central Park Drive Station Page
 Central Park Avenue entrance from Google Maps Street View

CTA Green Line stations
Railway stations in the United States opened in 2001